Kanchan Amatya (Nepali: कन्चन अमात्य) (born ) is a  Nepalese women's rights advocate, climate justice activist and social entrepreneur. She is the Founder and Executive Director of Sustainable Fish Farming Initiative (SFFI),  a female-owned social enterprise working to fight hunger and poverty in Nepal by empowering women farmers in Nepalese rural villages through sustainable fish farming practices. She also currently serves as the UN Women's Global Champion for Women's Economic Empowerment and UN Zero Hunger Champion

Life
Amatya, a graduate from University of Oklahoma was also a Global Changemakers Fellow (British Council London), Founder of Helpless Women and Children Service Society Nepal (HWCSS), OK Ambassador to Women Prevention and Protection Nepal (WPPC), Ambassador of Peace to World Peace Foundation (Thailand) and country director of Youth for Youth Organization Nepal. Under her leadership, she has also collected funds for her pilot projects like “Vocational Training for Women Empowerment” and “Help the Himalayan Children of Nepal”.

For her contributions for social cause in poverty alleviation and women upliftment in rural areas, she has been recognized in national and international magazines and awarded with awards like Voice of Women- Nepal, Rotary and JCI Excellence. She currently works as the President of Nepalese Student Association in OU and an ambassador to WPPC Nepal for Oklahoma State where she works towards the welfare of international students and raises awareness regarding the trafficking of women in Nepal. Furthermore, she has been honored with Clinton Global Initiative Presidential Honor Roll award by former US president Bill Clinton. She has also been recognized by Forbes 30 under 30 for her work at SFFI and 2019 Diana Memorial Award.

Honors and recognition 
2020 - The Legacy Award
 2019 - Andrew E. Rice Award for Excellence in International Development
 2019 - Diana Memorial Award
2019 - Discovery Channel's Girls Under 25 Changing the World
 2018 - Forbes Asia 30 under 30
 2018 - Presidential Honor Roll Award, 42nd President of the United States, President Bill Clinton, Clinton Global Initiative
 2018 - Women Economic Forum Award
 2018 - Young Leaders Award
 2018 - Every Day Young Hero Award
 2018 - GAA 30 under 30
 2017- 100 Leaders Under 25

References 

1996 births
Living people
Nepalese activists
Nepalese women activists
Place of birth missing (living people)
University of Oklahoma alumni
Social entrepreneurs